St Cross (Saint Cross = Holy Cross) may refer to the following places in England:

In Oxford
 St Cross College, Oxford
 St Cross Church, Oxford
 St Cross Road, Oxford

Elsewhere
 St Cross, Llandaff in Cardiff
 St Cross Priory in the Isle of Wight
 St Cross Church, Appleton Thorn in Cheshire
 St Cross Church, Knutsford in Cheshire
 St Cross Church, Middleton in Leeds
 Hospital of St Cross and surrounding area of Winchester, Hampshire
 Hospital of St. Cross, Rugby, a hospital in Rugby, Warwickshire
 St Cross Catholic Primary School in Hoddesdon, Hertfordshire
 St Cross Chapel, Reigate, an Anglican chapel in a preserved windmill in Surrey

See also
 Santa Croce (disambiguation)
 Sainte-Croix (disambiguation)
 Santa Cruz (disambiguation)